The Last Round (Spanish: El último Round) is a 1953 Mexican action film directed by Alejandro Galindo.

The film's sets were designed by the art director Gunther Gerszo.

Cast
 Lupita Alday 
 Manuel Casanueva 
 Arturo Castro 'Bigotón' 
 Miguel Funes hijo 
 María Gentil Arcos
 Emilia Guiú 
 Agustín de la Lanza
 José María Linares-Rivas 
 Lupe Llaca 
 Manuel Luévano 
 Celia Manzano 
 Héctor Mateos 
 Gloria Mestre 
 Lucio Moreno 
 Bruno Márquez 
 Pedro Ortega 'El Jaibo' 
 Ignacio Peón 
 José Pulido 
 Ray Pérez 
 Francisco Reiguera 
 Domingo Soler
 Julio Sotelo 
 Salvador Terroba 
 Carlos Valadez 
 Tommy Vargas

References

Bibliography 
 María Luisa Amador. Cartelera cinematográfica, 1950-1959. UNAM, 1985.

External links 
 

1953 films
1950s action films
Mexican action films
1950s Spanish-language films
Films directed by Alejandro Galindo
Mexican black-and-white films
1950s Mexican films